John Cahill (born 27 April 1940) is a former Australian rules football player and coach.

The Port Adelaide Football Club honoured Cahill by naming the award for the club's best and fairest player the John Cahill Medal.

SANFL career

Port Adelaide career
Cahill played 264 matches for Port Adelaide and 29 state matches for South Australia from 1958 to 1973. He captained Port Adelaide from 1967 to 1973 and skippered South Australia in 1969 and 1970.

Coaching career

Port Adelaide Football club senior coach (SANFL) (1974–1982)
After retiring, Cahill took up senior coaching. Starting with Port Adelaide, he would lead the club to three premierships in the SANFL  in 1977, 1979 and 1981.

Collingwood Football Club senior coach (VFL) (1983–1984)
Collingwood embarked on a nation-wide search for a senior coach at the end of the 1982 season to replace Tom Hafey who was sacked in the middle of the 1982 season and replaced by caretaker senior coach Mick Erwin for the rest of the 1982 season, who Collingwood did not retain for the 1983 season. Collingwood were  seeking to choose the best possible candidate in Australia as it desperately sought an end to an embarrassing premiership drought. The New Collingwood Magpies board, who had taken over the club after the 1982 election, finally settled on Cahill, a legendary South Australian player and coach, who hadn't even applied for the job after it was advertised across Australia. Instead, Cahill was asked to apply for the position, and he finally agreed to take the position on, mindful that the new board was about to embark on an almost unprecedented recruiting campaign. In being appointed the new Collingwood Football Club senior coach, Cahill would have access to an array of new and recycled talent that would be coming to the club, including David Cloke and Geoff Raines from the Richmond Football Club, Shane Morwood from the Sydney Swans football club, as well as three potential stars from interstate, Greg Phillips, Mike Richardson and Gary Shaw.

Cahill then spent two seasons as senior coach of the Collingwood Football Club in the VFL  from 1983 to 1984, where he led them to 6th in 1983 and 3rd in 1984. In the 1984 season, Cahill guided Collingwood to the preliminary finals, where they were eliminated by the eventual premiers  Essendon Bombers by 133 points. It was a frustrating end to the season and to Cahill's coaching time at Collingwood. With his two seasons done, Cahill sent a letter of resignation to the club. Cahill was replaced by Bob Rose as Collingwood Football Club senior coach for the 1985 season, who returned to the club in his second stint as coach.

Cahill coached Collingwood Football Club to a total of 47 games with 27 wins 20 losses with a winning percentage of 57 percent.

West Adelaide Football Club senior coach (SANFL) (1985–1987)
Cahill then returned to Adelaide where he coached West Adelaide in the SANFL from 1985 to 1987 taking the club to 3rd in his first season and the league Night Premierships in 1985 and 1987.

Port Adelaide Football club senior coach (SANFL) (1988–1996)
But it was Port Adelaide where his heart lay and he returned to Alberton in 1988 and led the club to six more premierships  in 1989, 1990, 1992, 1994 and 1995 before ending his SANFL coaching after 14 rounds of the 1996 season.

Port Adelaide Football club senior coach (AFL) (1997–1998)
Cahill then went to move on to become the inaugural Port Adelaide Football Club senior coach in 1997, when they were admitted into the AFL. Cahill then set about forming a group which would form the inaugural squad. Brownlow Medallist and 1990 Port Adelaide premiership player, Gavin Wanganeen, was signed from Essendon and made captain of a team made up of six existing Port Adelaide players, two from the Adelaide Crows, seven players from other SANFL clubs and 14 recruits from interstate. In Cahill's first season as Port Adelaide senior coach in its inaugural season in the AFL in the 1997 season, Cahill guided Port to finish ninth on the ladder, just missing out of the finals with ten wins, one draw and eleven losses.  In the 1998 season, Cahill guided Port to finish tenth on the ladder with nine wins, one draw and 12 losses. After two unsuccessful seasons in the AFL, Cahill left the club at the end of the 1998 season. Cahill was then replaced by his assistant coach Mark Williams as Port Adelaide Football Club senior coach in the AFL.

Cahill coached Port Adelaide Football club in the AFL to a total of 44 games with 19 wins, 23 losses and 2 draws with a winning percentage of 45 percent.

Port Adelaide Football club senior coach (SANFL) (2005)
However, in 2005, he was appointed senior coach of the Port Adelaide Magpies for one season to revitalise the struggling club. He took them to their first finals series in three seasons and they finished a respectable third. At the end of the season, he announced that he was retiring from coaching.

South Adelaide Football club senior coach (SANFL) (2008)
However, in 2008, he signed a two-year coaching deal with the South Adelaide Football Club as senior coach in an attempt to pull them out of their current slump. He resigned eight matches into the season, apparently citing "outside influences".

Personal life

His son is Darren Cahill (born 1965), a former professional tennis player from Australia and tennis coach.
His brother is Darrell Cahill who also played for Port Adelaide, playing 265 games.
His daughter Julie married Scott Hodges who played for Port Adelaide, Adelaide and Port Adelaide in the AFL. They have since divorced. His granddaughter Charlee Hodges played netball for the Adelaide Thunderbirds.
His uncle, Laurie Cahill was also a coach in the SANFL, coaching South Adelaide in 1947-8 and 1957 and West Adelaide from 1953 until 1956, taking the latter club to two Grand Finals in 1954 and 1956. Prior to that he was a dual premiership player with South Adelaide in the SANFL and a member of VFL side Richmond's 1943 grand final winning team.
He is first cousin to Barrie Barbary.
In 2010, he purchased an EFM Health Clubs Franchise located on-site at Pulteney Grammar School in the Adelaide CBD.

External links 
Official Website of the Port Adelaide Magpies Football Club
Official Website of the Port Adelaide Football Club
The Power From Port – Unofficial Port Adelaide Power and Magpies Football Clubs Website

References

1940 births
Collingwood Football Club coaches
Australian people of Irish descent
Living people
Port Adelaide Football Club (SANFL) players
Port Adelaide Football Club coaches
Port Adelaide Magpies coaches
Port Adelaide Football Club (SANFL) coaches
Port Adelaide Football Club players (all competitions)
South Adelaide Football Club coaches
West Adelaide Football Club coaches
Australian Football Hall of Fame inductees
All-Australians (1953–1988)
Australian rules footballers from Adelaide
South Australian Football Hall of Fame inductees